Peter F. Green is a materials scientist and the Deputy Laboratory Director for Science and Technology at the National Renewable Energy Laboratory.

Education 

Green earned BA and MA degrees in physics at Hunter College in 1981, and MS and PhD degrees in materials science and engineering at Cornell University in 1985.

Career 

Green started his career at Sandia National Laboratories in 1985, where he was the Manager of Glass and Electronic Ceramics Research during 1990-1996.
He became Professor of Chemical Engineering at the University of Texas at Austin in 1996, where he was later promoted to become B. F. Goodrich Professor of Materials Engineering.

Green was recruited to the University of Michigan in 2005 to chair the Department of Materials Science and Engineering.
He was the Vincent T. and Gloria M. Gorguze Professor of Engineering and professor of Materials Science and Engineering, Chemical Engineering, and Applied Physics at the University of Michigan
before being named as the new Deputy Laboratory Director for Science and Technology at the National Renewable Energy Laboratory in 2016.

In 2005, Green authored the textbook Kinetics, Transport, and Structure in Hard and Soft Materials published by CRC Press, Taylor & Francis.

Together with Sossina M. Haile and Simon Billinge, Green organized the Joint US-Africa Materials Science Institute (JUAMI - now the Joint Undertaking for an African Materials Institute), funded by the National Science Foundation.
They organized workshops in Addis Ababa, Ethiopia in 2012 and in Arusha, Tanzania in 2016.
Out of JUAMI, SciBridge was developed—a program to foster the scientific exchange between the US and Africa on topics in sustainable energy development.

Green was president of the Materials Research Society (MRS) in 2006.

Green was the inaugural editor-in-chief of MRS Communications.
He was associate editor of Physical Review Letters in 2000-2006.
Green serves on the editorial board of Progress in Energy, an IOPscience journal.

Honors 

 1995: Fellow of the American Physical Society
 1998: Fellow of the American Ceramic Society
 2016: Fellow of the American Association for the Advancement of Science
 2019: Fellow of the Materials Research Society
 2023: National Academy of Engineering

References

External links 
 
 
 
 
 
 

African-American engineers
20th-century American engineers
21st-century American engineers
Cornell University alumni
Hunter College alumni
Members of the United States National Academy of Engineering
Fellows of the American Physical Society
Fellows of the American Association for the Advancement of Science
Fellows of the American Ceramic Society
Living people
Year of birth missing (living people)
20th-century African-American people
21st-century African-American people